Derek Riddell (born 11 January 1967) is a Scottish television and theatre actor. He is best known for the portrayal of Dr. Jamie Patterson in the Channel 4 television series No Angels. He has also guest starred in Doctor Who, Ugly Betty, Silent Witness, Waterloo Road, and Shetland (2013–).

Early life
Riddell was born in Glasgow, the son of teacher and former actress Hope Ross and former St Mirren and Berwick Rangers footballer Ian Riddell. He graduated from the University of Strathclyde with a degree in business before training at the London Academy of Music and Dramatic Art, graduating in 1990.

Career
After finishing drama school, Riddell was cast in BBC Scotland production Strathblair and guest-starred in a number of popular TV shows such as Taggart, Casualty and The Bill. His big break came in the critically acclaimed Channel 4 series The Book Group and comedy drama No Angels. In addition to his television work he also regularly works in theatre productions.

Personal life
His partner is the actress Frances Carrigan; they have twins.

Filmography

Audio
Riddell took the part of Roj Blake in the three-part Blake's 7 audio drama broadcast on BBC Radio in 2007.

Notes

References

External links

1967 births
Male actors from Glasgow
Alumni of the London Academy of Music and Dramatic Art
Alumni of the University of Strathclyde
Living people
Scottish male stage actors
Scottish male television actors
20th-century Scottish male actors
21st-century Scottish male actors